A quad, or quadruple, is a figure skating jump with at least four (but fewer than five) revolutions. All quadruple jumps have four revolutions, except for the quadruple Axel, which has four and a half revolutions. The quadruple toe loop and quadruple Salchow are the two most commonly performed quads. Quadruple jumps have become increasingly common among World and Olympic level men's single skaters, to the point that not performing a quad in a program has come to be seen as a severe handicap. This phenomenon is often referred to as the "quad revolution". Since 2018, quadruple jumps have also become an increasingly common feature of women's skating, although they are not allowed under the ISU rules in the ladies' short program. The first person to land a ratified quadruple jump in competition was Canadian Kurt Browning in 1988. Japanese skater Miki Ando became the first female to do so, in 2002.

History of firsts

Men
The following table lists the first recorded quadruple jumps by male skaters in men's singles competition. Only successfully ratified jumps landed in an ISU sanctioned event, or officially recognized by the ISU count towards these records.

Soviet skater Alexandre Fadeev was the first skater to attempt a quadruple jump (a quad toe loop) in competition, at the 1984 Winter Olympics in Sarajevo, SR Bosnia and Herzegovina, Yugoslavia, but it was not officially recognized by the ISU because of a flawed landing.

On March 25, 1988, at the 1988 World Championships in Budapest, Hungary, Canadian skater Kurt Browning landed the first ratified quadruple jump (a quad toe loop) in competition (with three turns on the landing). Browning said: "I remember that there were a few people landing the jump (in practice) long before I did, and by watching them I was inspired to try it myself. After landing it, I certainly expected more skaters to start doing it in competition. I was surprised in the next few years when that really did not happen."

At the 1994 Winter Olympics in Lillehammer, Norway, Chinese skater Zhang Min landed the first clean quad (a toe loop) in Olympic competition.

On March 7, 1998, at the 1997–98 Junior Grand Prix Final in Lausanne, Switzerland, American skater Timothy Goebel landed the first ratified quadruple Salchow, in combination with a double toe loop.

On September 16, 2011, in the short program at the Colorado Springs Invitational, American skater Brandon Mroz landed the first ratified quad Lutz in a sanctioned competition. On November 12, he landed a ratified quad Lutz at the NHK Trophy, becoming the first skater to successfully land a quad Lutz in international competition.

On April 22, 2016, in the short program at the Team Challenge Cup in Spokane, United States, Japanese skater Shoma Uno landed the first ratified quadruple flip in competition.

On September 30, 2016, in the short program at the Autumn Classic International in Montreal, Canada, Japanese skater Yuzuru Hanyu landed the first ratified quadruple loop (also known as the "Rittberger" in Europe) in competition.

The first quadruple Axel attempt was by Russian skater Artur Dmitriev Jr. at the 2018 Rostelecom Cup. He landed forward and fell, receiving both a downgrade and fall deduction. On September 14, 2022, in the free skate at the 2022 CS U.S. International Figure Skating Classic, American skater Ilia Malinin landed the first successful quadruple Axel in competition. , he is the only skater to successfully land the jump in competition.

No quadruple-quadruple combination (quadruple jumps followed by quadruple loop or toe loop) or sequences (quadruple jumps followed by any quadruple jumps except for quadruple loop or toe loop) have yet been ratified. However, other quadruple combinations have been performed. Canada's Elvis Stojko landed the first quadruple jump in combination (a quad toe loop-double toe loop) at the 1991 World Championships. Stojko also landed the first quad-triple combination (a quad toe loop-triple toe loop) at the 1997–98 Champions Series Final in December 1997. Russian skater Evgeni Plushenko performed the world's first quad-triple-double combination (a quad toe loop-triple toe loop-double loop) at the 1999 NHK Trophy. Plushenko also landed the first quad-triple-triple combination (a quad toe loop-triple toe loop-triple loop) in competition at the 2002 Cup of Russia. Japanese skater Yuzuru Hanyu landed the first quad-triple sequence (a quadruple toe loop-triple Axel) at the 2018 Grand Prix of Helsinki.

Women
The following table lists the first recorded quadruple jumps by female skaters in women's singles competition. Only successfully ratified jumps landed in an ISU sanctioned event, or officially recognized by the ISU count towards these records.

French skater Surya Bonaly was the first female skater to attempt a quadruple jump in competition. She attempted a quad toe loop and a quad Salchow at the 1990 European Championships, however the jumps were not ratified. She attempted quad jumps at four more competitions (including the 1992 Winter Olympics), the final being the 1996 World Championships, but all were unsuccessful.

On December 14, 2002, Japanese skater Miki Ando became the first female skater to land a ratified quadruple jump (a Salchow) in her free skate at the 2002 Junior Grand Prix Final in The Hague, Netherlands.

On March 10, 2018, in the free skate at the World Junior Figure Skating Championships in Sofia, Bulgaria, Russian skater Alexandra Trusova became the first female skater to land a ratified quadruple toe loop in competition. She also became the first female skater to successfully land two quads in one free skate.  
 
The first ratified quadruple Lutz was landed by Russian skater Anna Shcherbakova in a domestic event in October 2018. On October 12, 2018, in the free skate at the Junior Grand Prix in Yerevan, Armenia, Alexandra Trusova landed the first ratified quadruple Lutz in international competition, becoming the first woman to land the jump.

On December 7, 2019, in the free skate at the Grand Prix Final in Torino, Italy, Alexandra Trusova landed the first ratified quadruple flip in competition.

In November 2021, Russian skater Adeliia Petrosian became the first female skater to attempt a quad loop in competition, at the 5th stage of Russian Cup qualifier, in combination with a double toe loop. She landed the quad loop with a "q" call (underrotated) and tried a second quad loop but fell. At the 2022 Russian National Championships on the senior level in December 2021, Petrosian landed two clean quad loops (one in combination). These were domestic events. Since then till now (fall 2022) there are no any ISU international competitions for Petrosian since the ISU banned participation by Russian skaters in all international competitions due to the 2022 Russian invasion of Ukraine.

The first female skater landed a quadruple jump in Olympic competition at the 2022 Winter Olympics. Competing as a Russian Olympic Committee athlete, Kamila Valieva landed multiple quads during the team event free skate on February 7 and one quad in the women's singles free skate on February 17. However, she faces disqualification pending investigation into a doping violation from earlier in the season. Fellow Russian Olympic Committee skaters Alexandra Trusova and Anna Shcherbakova also landed quad jumps in the women's singles free skate. At 2022 Winter Olympics, Anna Shcherbakova became the first woman (and the only woman as of Season 2022/23) to land a quad flip in combination with a triple jump (triple toeloop), also the first woman to land two quad flip jumps in one program. 

, no female skater has attempted a quadruple Axel in competition.

Russian skater Alexandra Trusova was the first female skater to land a quadruple jump in combination (a quad toe loop-triple toe loop), at the ISU Junior Grand Prix in Lithuania in September 2018.

Pairs

In pair skating competition, Russian skaters Marina Cherkasova and Sergei Shakrai performed the first ever quadruple twist lift in competition during their free skate at the 1977 European Championships.

At the 2002 Winter Olympics in Salt Lake City, Utah, United States, Chinese pairs skaters Shen Xue and Zhao Hongbo became the first skaters to attempt a throw quadruple jump (a throw quad Salchow). She landed, then fell, and the jump was not ratified. On November 17, 2007, in the free skate at the Trophée Eric Bompard competition in Paris, France, American pairs skaters Tiffany Vise and Derek Trent landed the first ratified throw quadruple jump (a quad Salchow). At the 2018 Winter Olympics in Pyeongchang, South Korea, Canadian pairs skaters Meagan Duhamel and Eric Radford completed the first throw quadruple Salchow in Olympic competition.

In 2004, Chinese pairs skaters Ding Yang and Ren Zhongfei attempted a throw quadruple toe loop at the Four Continents Championships; the landing was two-footed.

In 2015, Russian pairs skaters Yuko Kavaguti and Alexander Smirnov, at a domestic competition (1st stage of 2015 SPB Cup) became the first skaters to attempt a throw quadruple loop. The landing was two-footed, then she fell. Later in 2015, Kavaguti and Smirnov performed a throw quadruple loop at the 2015 Cup of China, although the landing was two-footed.

Also in 2015, Canadian pairs skaters Meagan Duhamel and Eric Radford, at a domestic competition (2015 Souvenir Georges-Ethier), attempted the first throw quadruple Lutz, but she fell.

Scoring
The quad jump is currently the highest scoring single element in the skater's program short of performing combinations. The current ISU scoring for quad jumps in base values is listed below.

Execution 
All quadruple jumps have four revolutions, except for the quadruple Axel, which has four and a half revolutions.

A jump harness is often employed in training quads. Quads require an average rotational frequency of around 340 rpm, with the peak rotational frequency usually exceeding 400 rpm. This is partly because of the heaviness of the skates and partly because skaters have to maintain the balance between the energy put into the jump versus the energy put into the rotation. The height of a quad can be between five percent and eight percent higher than a triple jump. If skaters cannot achieve the necessary height, they must spin faster to compensate. Efficient body contraction is also important due to conservation of angular momentum. According to Deborah King, a professor of exercise and sports sciences at Ithaca College, quads have a slightly higher angular momentum than lower difficulty jumps, but the major difference is in how skaters control the moment of inertia.

Skaters usually begin rotating the jump as soon as they leave the ice, but generally have less than two-thirds of a second to complete their rotation. However, some skaters begin rotating their jumps before they leave the ice, which is known as pre-rotation. This technique is reliant on the skater being physically small and puts added strain on the back, thereby increasing the risk of injury. It is particularly favoured by Russian women skaters but usually fails post-puberty. Despite being considered an example of flawed technique, it is not currently penalised by the technical panel.

Greater understanding of successful jump technique has developed over time. Kurt Browning, the first skater to land a ratified quad in competition, has said that when training the jump, "we really just jumped as high as we could and pulled in as hard as we could and hoped for the best." The smallest error may make the difference in the success of a quad attempt. Max Aaron has stated that "The minute your left arm is behind you, or your three-turn is too fast, if your hips don't turn in time, if your foot isn't in the right place, anything will throw you off." Research indicates that changes in arm position of even three or four degrees can significantly affect the rotational speed. According to Ross Miner, the quality of the ice can also affect the success of the jump, especially for the quad Salchow.

Controversy
Practicing quads increases the risk of injury as well as wear and tear on a skater's body. According to Aaron, "the force of a quadruple is huge", and practicing them means "you're going to fall a lot and take a beating". There is a lack of research into the impact of quads on the joints, but the repetitive nature of jump training and the fact that skaters always land on the same foot means that skaters are at risk of developing microfractures that can become more serious with time. Because of this, some coaches try to limit the number of jump repetitions skaters do in practice.

Concerns have been raised about the long-term impact of quads on the bodies of young skaters, especially girls. As of 2023, Elizabet Tursynbaeva of Kazakhstan is the only female skater over the age of 18 to ever land a quad in competition. The figure skating community remains divided about the sustainability of such jumps for women past puberty. Rafael Arutanian, coach of skaters such as Nathan Chen and Ashley Wagner, has questioned, "Will they still land these jumps at age 18 or 19? They are doing these jumps with bodies that have not developed yet, with bones that are still growing. What will they be at age 40? Will they all need new hips?" His concern has been echoed by fellow coach Linda Leaver, who predicts that "it will be extremely rare for a female skater to be able to do multiple quadruple jumps past puberty". She added, "I also think careers for men will be shorter because of the stress on backs, knees, and ankles, and the body type will be more of a determinate in who can dominate the sport." Quads are thought to favor those with lighter, slimmer bodies as they have a smaller moment of inertia. The tight body contraction necessary for landing quads is harder for adult women due to their wider hips.

See also
Quadruple jump controversy

References

Further reading

USA Today Graphic "Quad Jumps Require Speed, Power"

Figure skating elements
Figure skating records and statistics
Jumping sports